Madhur Mittal (born February 20, 1991) is an Indian actor. He is best known for his character 'Tito' in the TV serial Shaka Laka Boom Boom and his performance as Salim Malik in the film Slumdog Millionaire, which won the Academy Award for Best Picture of 2008 and for which he won the Screen Actors Guild Award for Outstanding Performance by a Cast in a Motion Picture.

Early life and career 
Madhur was born in Agra, India

In 1997, Madhur won Boogie Woogie a popular reality-based dance show on television. Shortly after, his family moved to Mumbai where he joined AVM High for his schooling and Madhur forayed into acting and dancing on stage in charity shows, cultural events and film-award ceremonies. He traveled the world performing in over 950 stage shows. As a child actor he worked in well known Hindi films like One Two Ka Four, Kahin Pyaar Na Ho Jaaye, and more recently Say Salaam India. He has also acted in several TV shows including Shaka Laka Boom Boom, Kasauti Zindagi Ki, Jalwa, Chamatkar, Prithviraj Chauhan and Dastak.

Madhur Mittal's role in Slumdog Millionaire has helped him to gain worldwide attention. To prepare himself for the role of Salim in Slumdog Millionaire after being cast he hung out with some of the ‘gangsters’ in Mira Road "to get into their heads". Director Danny Boyle gave him a series of the Godfather to watch as that had a crazy brother in it. Also, he had an accident which led him getting 12 stitches which helped with the rough look, he said. He had to grow his hair long, increase his skin tan and lose weight to act as Salim.

In 2008 he was nominated for the Black Reel Awards of 2008 for Best Ensemble and in 2009, along with the entire cast of Slumdog Millionaire he won the Screen Actors Guild Award for Outstanding Performance by a Cast in a Motion Picture at the 15th Screen Actors Guild Awards. He was also set to be present for the 66th Golden Globe Awards and the 15th Screen Actors Guild Awards.

Mittal plays Anwar Razdan in the second series of Kidnap and Ransom which aired on ITV1 from 23 February 2012.

Most recently, he starred in the Disney film Million Dollar Arm as Dinesh Patel and received good reviews for his performance as the villain in Maatr (2017). 

Mittal, in the year 2020, did a web series named High on the OTT platform MX Player and gained some good reviews for that role.

Awards and honours
Won
2009: Screen Actors Guild Award for Outstanding Performance by a Cast in a Motion Picture for Slumdog Millionaire

Nominated
2008: Black Reel Awards of 2008 - Best Ensemble for Slumdog Millionaire

Filmography

Web

Television

References

External links 
 of Slumdog Millionaire

Freida Pinto and Madhur Mittal Interview – Filmicafe

1988 births
Living people
People from Agra
Male actors from Uttar Pradesh
Indian male film actors
Male actors in Hindi cinema
21st-century Indian male actors
Outstanding Performance by a Cast in a Motion Picture Screen Actors Guild Award winners